Novocrambus is a genus of moths of the family Crambidae. It contains only one species, Novocrambus propygmaeus, which is found in Colombia and Guyana.

References

Crambini
Monotypic moth genera
Moths of South America
Crambidae genera
Taxa named by Hans Georg Amsel